Baratz is a surname. Notable people with the surname include:

 Abraham Baratz (1895–1975), Romanian–French chess master
 Max Baratz (born 1934), American army general
 Robert Baratz, American dentist and skeptic
 Yosef Baratz (1890–1968), Israeli activist and politician